André Aptroot (Heemskerk, 1961) is a Dutch mycologist and lichenologist.

In 1993 he did his PhD at the University of Utrecht under the supervision of Robbert Gradstein (nl). His dissertation was titled "Systematic studies on pyrenocarpous lichens and related fungi".

He specializes in fungi and lichens on which he has several hundreds of publications to his name. He has worked as curator at Centraalbureau voor Schimmelcultures (now Westerdijk Institute).

Aptroot is the founder of the Consultancy for Bryology and Lichenology, which is located in Soest where there is a herbarium with a collection of lichens mainly from the Netherlands and the tropics. From 2008 he has been collection manager at Pinetum Blijdenstein (nl) in Hilversum. He is a member of the International Association for Lichenology and the American Bryological and Lichenological Society.

He is a visiting professor at the Federal University of Mato Grosso do Sul in Campo Grande, Brazil. Because of Aptroot's broad expertise in tropical lichens, his colleague Ingvar Kärnefelt has called him "a Müller Argoviensis of our time". Aptroot is the author or co-author of three of the thirty most highly cited publications published in the scientific journal The Lichenologist from 2000 to 2019.

Eponymy
Several taxa have been named to honour Aptroot. These include the genus Aptrootia , and the following species: Mazosia aptrootii ; Buellia aptrootii ; Parmotrema aptrootii ; Byssoloma aptrootii ; Porina aptrootii ; Pertusaria aptrootii ; Didymella aptrootii ; Lecidella aptrootii ; Sclerophyton aptrootii ; Alloconiothyrium aptrootii ; Graphis aptrootiana ; Ocellularia aptrootiana ; Sclerococcum aptrootii ; Myxospora aptrootii ; Hazslinszkyomyces aptrootii ; Gyalideopsis aptrootii ; Lecidea aptrootii ; Pseudochapsa aptrootiana ; and Carbacanthographis aptrootii .

Selected publications
Aptroot has written more than 500 publications on the floristics and systematics of lichens and fungi. 
A Monograph of Didymosphaeria, André Aptroot: Studies in Mycology 37; 1–160 (1995) [thesis]

Veldgids Korstmossen, Kok van Herk, André Aptroot & Laurens Sparrius, KNNV Uitgeverij (2019)

See also
 :Category:Taxa named by André Aptroot

References

External links 
Citations for André Aptroot in Google Scholar
Netherlands Bryological and Lichenological Society Reports (nl)
Wikispecies: "Lichens of St Helena"; "Pictures of Tropical Lichens" and other publications of André Aptroot
Galapagos Species Checklist Lichenized Fungi, Frank Bungartz, Frauke Ziemmeck, Alba Yanez Ayabaca, Fredy Nugra, André Aptroot

1961 births
Living people
Dutch mycologists
People from Heemskerk
Utrecht University alumni
Dutch lichenologists
Dutch taxonomists